Živorad Jevtić (born December 27, 1943 in Kruševac, Kingdom of Yugoslavia – death 8 August 2000) was a Serbian football player. He capped 16 times for Yugoslavia.

External links
 

1943 births
2000 deaths
Yugoslav footballers
Yugoslavia international footballers
Serbian footballers
Yugoslav First League players
Red Star Belgrade footballers
Olympic footballers of Yugoslavia
Footballers at the 1964 Summer Olympics
Association football defenders
Sportspeople from Kruševac